Bejar can refer to:

Béjar, a city in the province of Salamanca in western Spain
Duke of Béjar, a Spanish title of nobility from 1453 to the present
Béjar (surname), a Spanish surname (also rendered as Bejarano, Bexar, or Vejar), for people with this name, see 
Dan Bejar, a singer-songwriter from Vancouver, British Columbia, Canada

See also
Bexar (disambiguation)
Bijar (disambiguation)